Janseodes is a monotypic moth genus of the family Erebidae erected by Pierre Viette in 1967. Its only species, Janseodes melanospila, was first described by Achille Guenée in 1852. It is found in India, South Africa and the US state of Florida.

Taxonomy
The genus has previously been classified in the subfamily Phytometrinae within Erebidae or in the subfamily Hadeninae of the family Noctuidae.

References

Boletobiinae
Noctuoidea genera
Monotypic moth genera